"Universe" is a song by South Korean–Chinese boy band Exo, released on December 26, 2017, as the lead single of their sixth extended play Universe. It was released in both Korean and Chinese versions by their label SM Entertainment.

Background and release
Produced by Shin Hyuk and MRey, "Universe" is described as a soft pop-rock ballad, with lyrics about how a person will search the universe just to find their lover. The song was released on December 26 with the album.

Music video
The Korean and Chinese music videos for "Universe" were released on December 26, 2017. It features Exo "melancholically reflecting on the caffeinated beverage and performing different activities that serve as metaphors for the tightly-wound, messy emotions described in the lyrics".

The Korean music video has over 44 million views on YouTube.

Promotion

Exo performed "Universe" for the first time on December 31 on MBC's year-end show, MBC Gayo Daejejeon. The song was also performed during Nature Republic's Green Nature Exo Fan Festival on February 3, 2018.

Commercial performance
"Universe" debuted at number two on the South Korean Gaon Digital Chart. It also topped the Billboard Korea Kpop Hot 100 for the first week of 2018.

Charts

Weekly charts

Monthly charts

Yearly charts

Sales

Downloads

Accolades

Music program awards

Release history

References

Exo songs
2017 songs
2017 singles
Korean-language songs
SM Entertainment singles
Billboard Korea K-Pop number-one singles